David Lambert may refer to:

Dave Lambert (American jazz vocalist) (1917–1966), American jazz lyricist and singer
Dave Lambert (English musician) (born 1949), songwriter, guitarist and singer
David Lambert (footballer) (1939–2016), Welsh footballer who played for Cardiff City and Wrexham
David Lambert (actor) (born 1993), American actor
David Lambert (trade unionist) (born 1933), British and international clothing trades union leader
David Lambert (Foundry Workers) (1922–1967), Scottish novelist and trade union leader
David L. Lambert, English astronomer

See also
Lambert (name)
David Lambert House, a historic house in Connecticut built by David Lambert in the 1700s